Gli inaffidabili is a 1997 Italian comedy film directed by Jerry Calà.

Cast

References

External links

1997 films
Films directed by Jerry Calà
1990s Italian-language films
1997 comedy films
Italian comedy films
1990s Italian films